Gephyrocapsa oceanica is a species of coccolithophorid. It is the type species of the genus Gephyrocapsa. The species is an important Pleistocene biostratigraphic marker.

References 

Haptophyte species